Erica S. Spatz is an American general cardiologist. She is an associate professor and clinical investigator at the Center for Outcomes Research and Evaluation at the Yale University School of Medicine.

Early life and education
Spatz was born and raised in New York where she attended Curtis High School in Staten Island. In her senior year of high school, she received a scholarship from the Posse Foundation to attend Vanderbilt University. She completed her Bachelor of Science degree with honors in human and organizational development from Vanderbilt in 1997 and enrolled at The Medical School for International Health of the Ben-Gurion University of the Negev for her medical degree. Spatz returned to North America following her medical degree and finished her residency at Montefiore Medical Center and fellowship at Yale New Haven Hospital, obtaining a Master of Health Science from Yale School of Medicine in 2010.

Career
Following her residency, Spatz was referred to the National Clinician Scholars Program (NCSP) at Yale School of Medicine, run by Harlan Krumholz. During her time with NCSP, Spatz co-founded Project Access-New Haven, a nonprofit community-based organization whose mission is to improve access to care for patients in New Haven.

Spatz' research focuses on individual- and community-based strategies to prevent cardiovascular disease and advance health equity. Alongside Adam Beckman, she calculated hospitalization and mortality rates from heart attacks amongst Medicare patients from 1999 to 2013, comparing low-income with high-income communities. They demonstrated that while heart attacks declined during this period, the rates in low-income communities were persistently higher than high-income communities, concluding that low-income communities required targeted approaches to reduce incidents of heart attacks. Continuing with this idea, she collaborated with the Eastern Caribbean Health Outcomes Research Network (ECHORN) Study to study hypertension patterns amongst Caribbean adults - a population experiencing high rates of hypertension, stroke, and heart disease. The are assessing 24-hour blood pressure patterns and their relationship to stress, sleep quality, and physical activity, as well as their association with social determinants of health. In 2018, Spatz and Krumholz were co-recipients of a $1.2 million, four-year grant from the National Institute of Biomedical Imaging and Bioengineering to develop a wrist-worn, cuffless blood pressure monitoring system. 
Spatz's research also focuses on patient engagement and shared decision making. In one study, she sought to understand why a significant number of people do not take their prescribed medication, even when doing so could add years to their life. Spatz's findings highlight the little-discussed phenomena of "convenience" in the context of medical care, finding that some people would be unwilling to take a pill or even drink a cup of tea on a daily basis if prescribed by a doctor, even if doing so could add years to their life. These findings catalyze the medical community to more deeply reckon with how "convenience," "inconvenience," and what is essentially a desire not be told what to do can be major forces at play in patient compliance. In 2019, Spatz led the first study focusing on the effect motivation text messages had on providing additional support to Chinese patients with heart disease.  She also published a study sponsored by Women's Health Research at Yale which showed that a sex-specific classification system could define and group types of heart attacks that were more common for women. During the COVID-19 pandemic in North America, Spatz's Project Access-New Haven helped launch a mHealth platform to assist low-income communities with accessing their health records and increase their participation in clinical studies.

References

External links

Living people
21st-century American women physicians
21st-century American physicians
American cardiologists
Women cardiologists
Yale School of Medicine faculty
Vanderbilt University alumni
Ben-Gurion University of the Negev alumni
Curtis High School alumni
Year of birth missing (living people)
American women academics